Duvar is an online news portal which focuses mainly on Turkish politics. Duvar's headquarters are located in Sariyer Istanbul.  It was founded in 2016 by Vedat Zencir, the first conciencious objector in Turkey.  Its current editor-in-chief is Ali Duran Topuz and it is described as reporting critically on the Turkish government. Several Academics for Peace who were dismissed from their work figure among its authors. Other journalists recruited were formerly employed by other Turkish media but dismissed due to their articles which criticized the Turkish government. Gazete Duvar was ordered several times to remove articles from the internet. In the past, Turkish judges have issued rulings which blocked access to certain articles it has published.  

In October 2019, Duvar launched a version in English, and its editor-in-chief is Cansu Çamlıbel, a former Washington D.C. correspondent  for the Hürryet newspaper. Its goal was to inform English speaking readers about events in Turkey from an independent point of view. The beginning was difficult, as the financial situation was dire with only 20% of expenses covered through advertising and since press freedom in Turkey is not as free as in other parts in the world, Çamlıbel was worried whether the outlet would be able to keep on reporting. According to the Center for American Progress, Duvar has become more popular than Bianet, which received financial support from the European Union.

References

External links
  (In Turkish)
 English version

Turkish news websites
2016 establishments